Densuș is a commune in Hunedoara County, Transylvania, Romania and the site of Densuș Church. It is composed of seven villages: Criva, Densuș, Hățăgel (Hacazsel), Peșteana (Nagypestény), Peștenița (Kispestény), Poieni (Pojény) and Ștei (Stejvaspatak).

Densuș was the property of the Romanian noble family Demsușan Mugina, later magyarised under the name of Demsusi Muzsina. One of the descendants of this family, Elisabeta de Margina, married John Hunyadi.

Natives
Aron Densușianu
Nicolae Densușianu

See also
Castra of Densuș

References

Communes in Hunedoara County
Localities in Transylvania
Țara Hațegului